Lidia Hortencia Rangel Ávalos (born December 29, 1955) is a Mexican former professional wrestler, more commonly known under the ring name Pantera Sureña (Spanish for "Southern Panther"). She has also worked as the enmascarada ("masked") wrestling characters La Galáctica, La Galáctica 2000, Lady Discovery and Lady Metal during her career. Her career began in 1969 and stretched until 2008 where she worked her last match.

As Pantera Sureña, Rangel started her career as a luchadora enmascarada, but lost her mask to Lola González in 1977. Her stints as La Galáctica, La Galáctica 2000, Lady Discovery and Lady Metal were all under a mask and only confirmed to be Rangel later in her career. In her almost 40-year career she has won the Distrito Federal Women's Championship, the UWA World Women's Championship, and the Mexican National Women's Tag Team Championship with Martha Villalobos in Mexico, as well as being the only luchadora to win the WWWA World Singles Championship in Japan.

Championships and accomplishments
Empresa Mexicana de Lucha Libre / Consejo Mundial de Lucha Libre
Distrito Federal Women's Championship (1 time)
Mexican National Women's Tag Team Championship (1 time)  with Martha Villalobos
Universal Wrestling Association
UWA World Women's Championship (1 time)
All Japan Women's Pro-Wrestling
WWWA World Singles Championship (1 time)

Luchas de Apuestas record

Footnotes

References

1955 births
Living people
Mexican female professional wrestlers
20th-century professional wrestlers
Mexican National Women's Tag Team Champions